In early Islamic history, the governor of Medina was an official who administered the city of Medina and its surrounding territories.

During the era of the Rashidun, Umayyad and early Abbasid caliphates, the governor was generally appointed by the caliph, and remained in office until he died or was dismissed. The governorship was one of the chief administrative positions in the Hijaz and carried with it certain symbolic privileges, including the opportunity to lead the annual Muslim pilgrimage.

Rashidun governors 

Known in pre-Islamic times as Yathrib, Medina (meaning simply "The City") became the residence of the Islamic prophet Muhammad following his Hijrah from Mecca in 622 AD. Under Muhammad and the first three Rashidun caliphs, Medina acted as the capital of a rapidly increasing Muslim Empire, but its remoteness from the emerging power centers of Syria and Iraq eventually undermined its political importance. Following the assassination of the third caliph 'Uthman ibn Affan in July 656 and the outbreak of the First Fitna or civil war, his successor 'Ali ibn Abi Talib was compelled to depart from Medina in order to assert his authority in Iraq, and the city lost its status as the capital of the Islamic state.

With the departure of 'Ali from Medina, administration of the city was delegated to a number of representatives appointed by him. These representatives remained in control of Medina until 660, when an army dispatched the Umayyad Mu'awiyah ibn Abi Sufyan arrived at the city and forced 'Ali's governor to flee to Iraq.

Umayyad governors (661–750) 
Following the ascendency of the Umayyads in 661, Medina's loss of its political significance became permanent. The Umayyad caliphs, who were firmly based in the region of Syria, had few incentives to relocate to the Hijaz, and they generally made their residence in the area of Damascus. Although Medina continued to retain its religious importance as one of the Holy Cities of Islam, it became something of a political backwater under the Umayyads and its old elites, the Ansar, were reduced to acting as a "pious opposition" to the new regime.

As the Umayyads had no interest in returning the capital to Medina, they instead dispatched governors to administer the city on their behalf. Governors were normally selected by the caliph and remained in office until they died or were dismissed in favor of a replacement candidate. In addition to Medina itself, they were sometimes (though not always) given jurisdiction over Mecca and al-Ta'if, and were often selected by the caliphs to act as leader of the annual pilgrimage to Mecca. In an effort to ensure that Umayyad interests were fully represented in the city, the caliphs usually selected blood or marital relatives for the position, but a few governors, such as with the Ansari Abu Bakr ibn Muhammad ibn Amr ibn Hazm, were exceptions to this rule.

Governors assigned to Medina during this period played no role in the Muslim conquests due to the lack of active military fronts near the Hijaz, but they were occasionally forced to deal with internal challenges to Umayyad rule. During the Second Fitna the Medinese threw off their allegiance to Yazid ibn Mu'awiyah (r. 680–683) and expelled all of the Umayyads then in the city; this attempt to regain their old power, however, came to an end with their defeat at the Battle of al-Harrah in August 683, and the city was pillaged by the victorious Syrian troops in retaliation for its disobedience. Shortly afterwards Medina came under the nominal control of the anti-caliph Abdallah ibn al-Zubayr (r. 683–692), but the Umayyads took back the city near the end of the Fitna and their hold on it was thereafter generally secure until the last years of their rule.

Umayyad control of Medina came to an end during the period of the Third Fitna; the city was lost temporarily to Ibadi rebels in 747, and was then lost permanently with the overthrow of the dynasty by the Abbasid Revolution in 750.

Abbasid governors 
The administrative situation of Medina was initially little changed by the coming of the Abbasids, who were generally centered in the region of Iraq. Governors of Medina continued to be appointed by the caliph and were selected to lead several of the annual pilgrimages. Like their predecessors, the Abbasid caliphs frequently chose members of their own dynasty for the governorship, but they also often appointed individuals from other families who were related to the Abbasids in some capacity.

In the first decades of Abbasid rule Medina was occasionally the scene of Alid rebel movements, but these were generally minor affairs and were easily put down by the government. The short-lived revolt of Muhammad al-Nafs al-Zakiyya in 762, which was briskly defeated despite having had strong support from among the Medinese elite, particularly served as a demonstration as to how far the city had declined in terms of actual political influence, and Muhammad's choice to base the rebellion in Medina was specifically criticized by Muslim historians for prioritizing the city's religious significance over any sound strategic considerations. A later revolt by Muhammad's nephew al-Husayn ibn Ali al-Abid was also brief and ended in failure at the Battle of Fakhkh near Mecca in 786, while the seizure of Medina by a lieutenant of the pro-Alid rebel Abu al-Saraya al-Sari ibn Mansur in 815 during the Fourth Fitna was likewise temporary and the city was soon restored to Abbasid control.

Two major sources for the identities of governors of Medina, the annalists Muhammad ibn Jarir al-Tabari and Khalifah ibn Khayyat, give regular updates down to the mid-780s, but provide only sporadic information after that time. The cessation of coverage, as well as available numismatic evidence, indicate that Medina may have been declining in importance during this period, and that it was gradually being superseded by Mecca as the primary administrative center of the Hijaz. In the ninth and tenth centuries the Hijaz was also affected by a general economic downturn and Medina began to be threatened by brigand raids, of which at least one was serious enough to prompt the central government to send an expedition to restore order.

With the collapse of the Abbasids' political power in the early tenth century, the Ikhshidid ruler of Egypt Muhammad ibn Tughj al-Ikhshid was granted jurisdiction over Mecca and Medina by the caliph al-Radi in 935. Later that century, the descendants of Husayn ibn Ali gained local control of Medina, and they thereafter ruled the Amirate of Medina under Egyptian suzerainty down nearly to the Ottoman conquest in 1517.

See also 
 List of Umayyad governors of al-Andalus
 List of caliphal governors of Arminiyah
 List of caliphal governors of Egypt
 List of caliphal governors of Ifriqiyah
 List of Umayyad governors of Iraq
 List of caliphal governors of Sind

Notes

References 
 

 
 
 
 
 
 
 
 
 
 
 
 
 
 

Medina
Governors

Medieval Islamic world-related lists